St Cross College is a constituent college of the University of Oxford in England. Founded in 1965, St Cross is an all-graduate college with gothic and traditional-style buildings on a central site in St Giles', just south of Pusey Street. It aims to match the structure, life and support of undergraduate colleges, with the relaxed atmosphere of an all-graduate college.

History
St Cross College was formally set up as a society by the University on 5 October 1965; it was to admit its first graduate students (five in number) in the following year. Like the majority of Oxford's newer colleges, St Cross has been co-educational since its foundation.

The college took its name from its proximity to these places. In 1976 negotiations began between the college and the members of Pusey House over the possibility of moving the college to the St Giles site. The negotiations were successful, and in 1981 the college moved from St Cross Road into a site owned by Pusey House for a leased period of 999 years. The old site on St Cross Road continued to be used, initially by the Centre for Islamic Studies (at that time an Associated Centre of the college), and then subsequently in the early 1990s the site was developed by the college in collaboration with Brasenose College. The site now houses two residential buildings, which were opened in 1996. 

On 18 November 2010, it was announced that Sir Mark Jones, previously Director of the Victoria and Albert Museum, had been elected as the next Master of the college; he took up the post in September 2011. Unlike every other college head (except the presidents of Kellogg and Reuben), the Master of St Cross is appointed not by the college's governing body but by the University Council. Therefore, the election has only the character of a recommendation to Council, albeit one which is constantly followed. 

In May 2016, it was announced that the Fellows of St Cross College had elected Carole Souter, then chief executive of the National Heritage Memorial Fund and Heritage Lottery Fund, as the next Master of the college. In September 2016, she succeeded Sir Mark Jones, who had been Master of St Cross since 2011. In June 2022 it was announced that Souter will retire in September 2022. Rana Mitter was appointed as interim Master in October 2022.

Buildings
The college is located on St Giles' near to the Ashmolean Museum, south of Regent's Park College and immediately north of Blackfriars, and faces St John's College. It is close to the Classics Faculty and the Oriental Institute.

The college buildings are structured around two quads, the Richard Blackwell Quadrangle and the new West Quad. St Cross shares the site with Pusey House, which comprises the first floor and parts of the ground floor to the eastern side of the Blackwell quad, a library on the first floor on its western side, as well as the chapel. The original Pusey House buildings around the Blackwell quad, including the chapel, date from the period of 1884 to 1926 and are mainly the work of the architects Temple and Leslie Moore and Ninian Comper. Discreet internal alterations were made when St Cross moved in by Geoffrey Beard and the Oxford Architects Partnership. Among these was the conversion of a cloister and store rooms into the Saugman Hall (now the Saugman Common Room) named after Per Saugman, a former Director of Blackwell Scientific Publications and a former fellow of the college. The first quadrangle was named the Richard Blackwell Quadrangle in honour of Richard Blackwell (another former fellow); both Saugman and Blackwell played a crucial part in securing the large Blackwell benefaction for St Cross. Most students, however, used to refer to the Richard Blackwell Quadrangle by its nickname: 'the Quad'. After completion of the second quad, it is now commonly known as 'the front Quad'.

At the west side of the Blackwell Quad lies the Four Colleges Arch, named after the four colleges which had contributed especially generous capital and recurrent funding to St Cross: Merton, All Souls, Christ Church, and St John's. Behind the Four Colleges Arch originally lay a large open garden bordered by medieval boundary wall. This offered the college the possibility of expanding its buildings and erecting a second quadrangle, the West Quad.

Work was first completed on the South Wing on the southern side of the West Quad, containing a hall and kitchen, with bar, the Ian Skipper conference room, and the Caroline Miles games room below, a guest room and study bedrooms above. This development has in part been financed by Ian Skipper, Domus fellow of the college, after whom the conference room on the lower ground floor was named.

A second building to the western and northern sides of the West Quad was set to be completed in time for the college's semicentennial in 2015. However, planning permission for the new building was rejected, as it required the demolition of a medieval boundary wall, an action which the council qualified as 'unjustifiable'. Planning permission was subsequently granted following an appeal, and the new West Wing building was completed in 2017. The new West Quad includes 50 student bedrooms, a lecture theatre, a library with a garden room (the Douglas and Catherine Wigdor Library), several seminar rooms, and the Audrey Blackman Guest Room. Soon after it opened, cracks in the glassfibre reinforced concrete window surrounds appeared, which were found not to have been manufactured to specification and required quality. The building subsequently closed for replacement with a different material, and should reopen in 2023.

In addition to the current main site, the college still owns its original site on St Cross Road, located near the Law Faculty and English Faculty. After the college moved to its present location, this site was developed into student accommodation, the St Cross Annexe. The site is shared with Brasenose, who also own an annexe on the site. Additional buildings which are run by St Cross College as student accommodation include Bradmore Road House, Stonemason House, and the Wellington Square houses.

The master's lodgings are also located in Wellington Square.

Academia
In 2016, St Cross had over 550 graduate students, studying for degrees in all subjects. There is a strong emphasis on international diversity, with regularly over 75% of the students coming from outside the UK (2016: 83%). This is reflected in the college motto Ad quattuor cardines mundi, meaning 'to the four corners of the earth'. The fellowship is similarly diverse and represents a broad range of academic disciplines in the sciences and the arts.

The college awards a number of scholarships in different subjects, predominantly in the humanities and social sciences.

Student life
Students are admitted and matriculated according to the same admissions procedures as the other colleges and halls of the University of Oxford. Unusually for an Oxford college, there is a founding tradition of sharing social facilities between fellows, members of Pusey House, the Common Room and students, with no separate high table or Senior Common Room. This gives the college a much more informal atmosphere and makes it an important community of scholars who forge links across a range of subjects.

The college has an active social calendar for both current students and alumni. There are a range of college societies and sports teams (often in collaboration with other colleges), as well as weekly academic seminars and annual conferences.

The college's Boat Club shared with Wolfson College is particularly successful, and like many other college boat clubs competes both within the university itself and in external competitions. The St Cross women's football team also enjoys success, becoming Cuppers Champions in 2015.

Other events in the college include regular formal hall, a feast once a term, 'bops' (informal college-based parties) and a yearly ball. As a result of the large international community at St Cross, the college strives to cater a wide range of events from other cultures; St Cross was the first Oxford college to officially celebrate Chinese New Year. Reunion events for alumni are hosted by the college annually both in Oxford itself and abroad.

Some students are provided with accommodation in the first year of study. College students have the opportunity to participate in a variety of extra-curricular activities. There are sports teams in football, rowing, netball and basketball as well as opportunities to play other sports for other Oxford colleges.

The Common Room also provides arts activities, such as an annual play and pantomime, as well as several social societies. The cafe/bar area is a large oak-panelled room, including leather sofas, a TV, a sound system for bi-termly parties (bops), a football table. There is also a free DVD rental library. During Trinity Term, croquet and Pimms are enjoyed on the quad.

Administration
Together with Kellogg and Reuben, St Cross is one of only three Oxford colleges without a royal charter. It is officially a society of the university rather than an independent college. The main difference from an independent college is that the governing body only recommends a Master, who is then appointed by Council; in other colleges, the head of house is elected and appointed by the governing body directly. For accounting purposes, the societies are considered departments of the university. St Cross has one of the smallest endowments of any Oxford college, at approximately £8 million. Nevertheless, the college has several scholarships that it awards to current and prospective graduate students and that are funded by third party donations and alumni.

Traditions

Grace
The college grace is:

Egalitarianism

The college prides itself on a deliberate egalitarianism among its members. Unlike most colleges, St Cross does not divide its common rooms between senior and middle members.  All facilities are open to everyone, students and fellows alike. There is no High Table in the dining hall, and, at formal meals, the Master and Fellows sit amongst the students in the dining hall (which seats 120 people across 3 long tables), with the master sitting at the centre of the top table.

People associated with the college

Notable alumni

 Aharon Appelfeld, Israeli novelist
 Steve Baker, British politician
 Ruth Barnes, academic and curator of the Ashmolean Museum and Yale University Art Gallery
 Christian M. M. Brady, academic at Penn State University
 Tilman Brück, director of the Stockholm International Peace Research Institute
 John Burn, geneticist
 Kurt M. Campbell, American diplomat and Assistant Secretary of State for East Asian and Pacific Affairs
 Alan Carter, professor and environmental philosopher
 Steven Casey, historian and academic
 Yusuf Çetin, Turkish religious leader
 Roger Collins, medieval and papal historian
 Lisa Downing, author and professor
 Tim Foster, Olympic rowing gold medalist
 Toshiharu Furukawa, Japanese politician, professor, and CEO
 M. G. Harris, children's author
 R. Joseph Hoffmann, religious historian and translator
 John F. Jungclaussen, journalist and author, UK correspondent Die Zeit
 John Kingman, British mathematician and fellow of the Royal Society
 Hermione Lee, Goldsmiths' Professor of English Literature, President of Wolfson College, Oxford
 Kelsey Leonard, first Native American woman to earn a degree from the University of Oxford
 Sally Mapstone, Principal and Vice-Chancellor of the University of St Andrews
 Jason Gaverick Matheny, academic, risk assessor and co-founder of New Harvest
 Pete Mathias, musician and drummer in the band Filligar
 Sultan Muhammad V, Sultan of the Malaysian state of Kelantan and 15th Yang di-Pertuan Agong of Malaysia
 Karen O'Brien, Warden and Vice-Chancellor of Durham University 
 Jonathan Orszag, American economist, politician and CEO
 David Digby Rendel, British politician
 Richard Rudgley, anthropologist, author, and television presenter
 Peter Schweizer, political writer and researcher at Stanford University
 , academic and author
 Anne Ulrich, biochemist and professor at the Karlsruhe Institute of Technology
 Mihai Răzvan Ungureanu, former Prime Minister of Romania, diplomat and politician
 Douglas Wigdor, American lawyer and former Assistant District Attorney for New York
 Graham Wiggins, musician
 Mungo Mason, Scottish professional rugby

Fellows

Honorary Fellows

 Muhammad V of Kelantan, former Yang di-Pertuan Agong (King) of Malaysia

Masters
 William van Heyningen, 1966–1979
 Godfrey H. Stafford, 1979–1987
 Richard C. Repp, 1987–2003
 Andrew S. Goudie, 2003–2011
 Sir Mark Jones, 2011–2016
 Carole Souter, 2016–2022

References

Bibliography
 Kenneth Hylson-Smith, A History of Holywell and St Cross College/Brasenose College Residential Site (Oxford, 1996).
 Kenneth Hylson-Smith, David Sturdy & Brian Atkins, A History of St Giles and the St Cross College/Pusey House Site (Oxford, 1993).
 'St Cross College', in The Encyclopaedia of Oxford, ed. Christopher Hibbert (London, 1988), 385–6.
 St Cross College Record, 1– (1980–).
 W. E. van Heyningen, The Founding of St Cross College, Oxford: An Interested Account (Oxford, 1988).

External links

 
 Official website of the Student Representative Committee (SRC)
 Virtual tour of the Blackwell Quad

 
Colleges of the University of Oxford
Educational institutions established in 1965
Buildings and structures of the University of Oxford
Oxford, St Cross College
1965 establishments in England
Grade II listed buildings in Oxford
Postgraduate schools in the United Kingdom